Mikail O. Shishkhanov (Russian: Микаил Османович Шишханов) is a Russian businessman and financier.

Personal life 
Mikail Shishkhanov was born on August 6, 1972 in Grozny (capital city of the Chechen Republic, Russia). 	
In 1995 he graduated from Peoples’ Friendship University named after Patrice Lumumba with a master's degree  in economics and law and in 2000 - Finance Academy under the Government of the Russian Federation. Shishkhanov is a Doctor of Economics, Ph.D. in law, Associate Member of the Russian Academy of Natural Sciences.

He is married and has four children. His hobbies are chess and boxing.

Career 
Shishkhanov was the majority shareholder (59,4%) of B&N Bank (Public Joint-Stock Company) and the owner of ROST Bank.

Shishkhanov is also the former co-owner of the leading development companies. (INTECO Russian corporate site, Private joint-stock company “Patriot” (total shareholding is 95%.))

References

External links
 INTECO Russian corporate site

1972 births
Living people
Russian bankers
Russian chief executives
Russian male writers
Russian billionaires
Peoples' Friendship University of Russia alumni
People from Grozny
Financial University under the Government of the Russian Federation alumni
Ingush people